Belalanda is a town and commune in Madagascar. It belongs to the district of Toliara II, which is a part of Atsimo-Andrefana Region. The population of the commune was estimated to be approximately 7,000 in 2001 commune census.

Belalanda is served by a local airport. Primary and junior level secondary education are available in town. The majority 60% of the population works in fishing. 19% are farmers, while an additional 20% receives their livelihood from raising livestock. The most important crop is cassava, while other important products are sugarcane, maize and sweet potatoes.  Services provide employment for 1% of the population.

Tourism
The beach of Mangily, a high spot of tourism in the area of Tulear is situated on the territory of the municipality of Belalanda.

Notable people 
 

Mahasumpo Raveloson (1909–1966), politician

References and notes 

Populated places in Atsimo-Andrefana